Jill is a novel by English writer Philip Larkin, first published in 1946 by The Fortune Press, and reprinted by Faber and Faber (London) in 1964. It was written between 1943 and 1944, when Larkin was twenty-one years old and an undergraduate at St John's College, Oxford.

The novel is set in wartime Oxford, the city in which it was written. Protagonist John Kemp is a young man from "Huddlesford" in Lancashire, who goes up to Oxford. With great sympathy it analyses his emotions at this first experience of privileged southern life (he had never been south of Crewe). Socially awkward and inexperienced, Kemp is attracted by the reckless and dissipated life of his roommate Christopher Warner, a well-off southerner who has attended a minor public school, tellingly called "Lamprey College". The eponymous Jill is Kemp's imaginary sister, whom he invents to confound Warner. Kemp then discovers a real-life Jill called Gillian, the 15-year-old cousin of Warner's friend Elizabeth. Kemp becomes infatuated with Gillian, but his advances are thwarted by Elizabeth and rebuffed by Gillian.

Larkin writes of his own experiences of Oxford during the war in the Introduction he added for the republication by Faber and Faber in 1964:

Life in college was austere. Its pre-war pattern had been dispersed, in some instances permanently ... This was not the Oxford of Michael Fane and his fine bindings, or Charles Ryder and his plovers' eggs. Nevertheless, it had a distinctive quality.

A boy with the surname Bleaney (we are not told his Christian name or indeed anything else about him) makes a fleeting appearance in 'Jill' as one of John Kemp's classmates at Huddlesford Grammar School.  Larkin later used this unusual surname in his well-known poem 'Mr Bleaney', although there is nothing to indicate that it refers to the same person.

Larkin himself was convinced that the novel was never more than a juvenile 'indiscretion' and that the plot was weak and 'immature'. His first draft was severely censored by the printer's manager and Larkin later wrote: "I am sick of the Fortune Press. They only publish dirty novels and any printer who does their work is extra suspicious." No manuscript version of the novel has survived. Bloomfield, in his 1979 bibliography, records that even the original typescript was later thrown away by the author. When the book was re-published by Faber and Faber, Larkin ensured that the censorship of some of the intended expletives was reversed.

The book was later published in the USA, first by St. Martin's Press in 1965 and then, in 1976, by The Overlook Press, a small American publisher with a reputation for stylish limited editions.

Jill was published in paperback by Faber and Faber,  in 2005.

Other works by Philip Larkin 
 Trouble at Willow Gables and Other Fiction 1943-1953 (writing as "Brunette Coleman")
 A Girl in Winter (1947), Faber and Faber, London
 Philip Larkin: Required Writing (1983), Faber and Faber, London
 Collected Poems – 1988 edition (Philip Larkin) (1988), introd. by Anthony Thwaite, The Marvell Press-Faber and Faber; London-Boston
Selected Letters of Philip Larkin, Anthony Thwaite, editor (1992)

References

Further reading 
 An Enormous Yes: in memoriam Philip Larkin (1986), ed. by Harry Chambers. Calstock: Peterloo Poets
Philip Larkin: A Writer's Life, Andrew Motion (1993)
The Devil at Oxford: Philip Larkin's Jill by Nina Chasteen (1990)

1946 British novels
English novels
Philip Larkin
Novels set in University of Oxford